Holostichidae is a family of littoral ciliates.

Genera 
According to the Catalogue of Life, 10 genera are accepted within Holosticha.
 Afrothrix
 Amphisia
 Amphista
 Anteholosticha
 Birojima
 Caudiholosticha
 Holosticha
 Holostichides
 Periholosticha
 Psammomitra

References 

Hypotrichea
Eukaryote families
Taxa described in 1961